Koningin Elisabeth's dochter is a 1915 Dutch silent drama film directed by Johan Gildemeijer.

Cast
Julia Cuypers	... 	Julia Berna
Frederick Vogeding	... 	Man van Julia Berna / Husband of Julia Berna
Martijn de Vries	... 	Gonda Berna op 3-jarige leeftijd / Gonda Berna aged 3
Hesje de Vries	... 	Gonda Berna op 5-jarige leeftijd / Gonda Berna aged 5
Jopie Tourniaire	... 	Jeane Bachiloupi
August Van den Hoeck	... 	Alex Dalfo
Paula de Waart	... 	Actrice / Actress
Alex Benno	... 	Impresario / Agent

External links 
 

1915 films
Dutch silent feature films
Dutch black-and-white films
1915 drama films
Dutch drama films
Silent drama films